Weed is an unincorporated community in Adair County, Kentucky, United States.  Its elevation is 1043 feet (318 m).

The Weed post office, which is no longer in operation, was established on October 15, 1901, by Charles Weed Sparks, Sr., who gave it his middle name.  Sparks had earlier run the post office at nearby Sparksville, which was also named for him.

References

Unincorporated communities in Adair County, Kentucky
Unincorporated communities in Kentucky